2012 Hong Kong Women League FA Cup is the 1st edition of the structured Women League FA Cup. It is a knockout competition for all the teams of the 2012–13 Hong Kong Women League.

Calendar

Bracket

External links
 Fixtures - HKFA Women League FA Cup

Football cup competitions in Hong Kong